James Devins (1873 – 20 September 1922) was an Irish Sinn Féin politician. He was elected unopposed as a Sinn Féin Teachta Dála (TD) to the 2nd Dáil at the 1921 elections for the Sligo–Mayo East constituency. He opposed the Anglo-Irish Treaty and voted against it. He was re-elected as an anti-Treaty Sinn Féin TD to the 3rd Dáil at the 1922 general election. His death in September 1922 "at the hands of former comrades", would indicate that he was a casualty of the Irish Civil War. He was executed without trial with five other comrades who had all surrendered to the Free State troops.

His grandson Jimmy Devins also served as a Fianna Fáil TD for Sligo–North Leitrim from 2002 to 2011.

See also
Families in the Oireachtas

References

1873 births
1922 deaths
Early Sinn Féin TDs
Members of the 2nd Dáil
Members of the 3rd Dáil
Politicians from County Sligo
Politicians from County Mayo